This is a list of people associated with Rensselaer Polytechnic Institute, including presidents, institute leaders, trustees, alumni, professors and researchers.

For a list of the highest elected student leaders at RPI see: List of RPI Grand Marshals.

Presidents of Rensselaer Polytechnic Institute

Notable alumni

Business
John J. Albright (1868), businessman and philanthropist
Marshall Brain, founder of HowStuffWorks.com
Gary Burrell, founder of Garmin
Dan Buckley (1991), president of Marvel Entertainment
George Lewis Capwell Cronin (1925) businessman and Founder of the Ecuadorian Baseball & Soccer Team - Club Sport Emelec
Nicholas M. Donofrio (1967), director of research at IBM, trustee
Joseph Gerber (1947), founder of Gerber Scientific
William Gurley (1839), and Lewis E. Gurley, brothers and founders of Gurley Precision Instruments.
J. Erik Jonsson (1922), co-founder and former president of Texas Instruments Incorporated, and mayor of Dallas
William Mow (1959), founded apparel maker Bugle Boy in 1977.
Nicholas T. Pinchuk Chairman & CEO of Snap-on
Curtis Priem (1982), NVIDIA co-founder; architect of the first PC video processor and many that followed; trustee
Sean O’Sullivan (1985), along with three other RPI students (Laszlo Bardos, Andrew Dressel, and John Haller), founded MapInfo on the RPI campus
William Meaney President & CEO of Iron Mountain
John Rigas, co-founder of Adelphia Communications
Sheldon Roberts (1948), member of the "traitorous eight" who created Silicon Valley; co-founder of Fairchild Semiconductor and Amelco
Bert Sutherland, manager of Sun Microsystems laboratories
William H. Wiley (1866), Civil War artillery commander, co-founder of publisher John Wiley and Sons, and US State Representative
Edward Zander, former CEO of Motorola
Keith Raniere,  American felon, convicted sex trafficker and the founder of NXIVM, a multi-level marketing company and cult based near Albany, New York.

Humanities, arts, and social sciences
Felix Bernard, composer of a Christmas song, Winter Wonderland
Julie Berry, children's author
Charles Amos Cummings, architect and historian
Bobby Farrelly, film director, writer and producer, Dumb and Dumber, Shallow Hal, There's Something About Mary
Fitzedward Hall (1901), Orientalist
David Hayter, Canadian voice actor
Ned Herrmann, creator of the Herrmann Brain Dominance Instrument
Lily Hevesh, YouTuber and domino artist (attended RPI for less than a year before dropping out to pursue domino art full time)
 Erin Hoffman, game designer and author
Tyler Hinman (2006), multiple winner of the American Crossword Puzzle Tournament
Joe Howard, Jr. (1857), reporter and war correspondent
Jennifer & Kevin McCoy (1994), artists who both graduated from RPI
Meera Nanda, writer, philosopher of science, and faculty  Jawaharlal Nehru University, New Delhi
Mary Pride (1974), Christian author
Samuel Wells Williams, 19th century linguist
Warren Davis (1977), video game designer/programmer (co-creator of Q*bert)
Zachary Barth, video game designer (founder of Zachtronics), creator of Infiniminer

Invention and engineering
Truman H. Aldrich (1869), civil engineer, also briefly a US State Representative
 Karthik Bala, co-founder of Vicarious Visions
Garnet Baltimore (1881), first African-American engineer and Garnet D. Baltimore Lecture Series honoree
Peter Bohlin 1958, architect of the famous 5th Avenue Apple Store
Virgil Bogue (1868), chief engineer of Union Pacific Railroad and Western Maryland Railway constructions
Bimal Kumar Bose (1932), electrical engineer
Leffert L. Buck (1968), civil engineer and a pioneer in the use of steel arch bridge structures, including the Williamsburg Bridge in NYC
Alexander Cassatt (1859), civil engineer and railroad executive
George Hammell Cook (1839), state geologist of New Jersey
Dr. Allen B. Dumont (1924), perfected the cathode ray tube; the "father of modern TV"
Theodore N. Ely (1896), railroad executive
George Washington Gale Ferris Jr. (1881), inventor of the Ferris wheel
Lois Graham (1946), the first woman to receive an engineering degree from RPI, and the first woman in the U.S. to receive a PhD in mechanical engineering
Frederick Grinnell (1855), inventor of the modern fire sprinkler
Walter Lincoln Hawkins (1931), African-American inventor of plastic telephone wire
Beatrice Hicks (1965), co-founder of Society of Women Engineers
Henry Wilson Hodge (1885), Director of railroads for the American Expeditionary Force during World War I
Marcian Hoff (1958), "father of the microprocessor"
Dorothy Hoffman (1949), the first woman to serve as president of any scientific society in the US, elected president of American Vacuum Society in 1974
J. Christopher Jaffe (1949), leader in architectural acoustic design; taught acoustics at the Juilliard School, City University of New York, and Rensselaer
Theodore Judah (1837), visionary of the transcontinental railroad
Robert Loewy (1947), aeronautical engineer
William Metcalf (1858), steel manufacturing pioneer
Keith D. Millis (1938), metallurgical engineer and inventor of ductile iron
Ralph Peck (1937), geotechnical engineer
Emil H. Praeger (1915), designer of Shea and Dodger Stadiums, Tappan Zee Bridge, Arecibo Telescope and a renovation of the White House
George Brooke Roberts (1849), civil engineer, 5th president of the Pennsylvania Railroad
Washington Roebling (1857), chief engineer of the Brooklyn Bridge
James Salisbury (1844), physician and inventor of the Salisbury Steak
Steven Sasson (1973), engineer and inventor of the digital camera
Robert "RJ" Scaringe (2005), CEO & Founder of Rivian
Massood Tabib-Azar, chemical engineer
Raymond Tomlinson (1963), inventor of the email system
David L. Noble (1940), inventor of the floppy disk
Alan M. Voorhees (1947), city planner and traffic forecaster; former Rensselaer trustee; principal supporter for the Voorhees Computing Center at Rensselaer
John Alexander Low Waddell (1871), civil engineer and prolific bridge builder
Robert H. Widmer (1938), aeronautical engineer and designer of the B-58 supersonic bomber
 John F. Schenck (1961), physician and co-inventor of the first clinically viable high-field MRI scanner at General Electric

Military
William L. Haskin (1861), U.S. Army brigadier general
Harold J. Greene (1980), major general, U.S. Army, highest ranking casualty of War in Afghanistan
Arthur L. McCullough, U.S. Air Force general
Ario Pardee Jr. (1858), Union Army veteran who attained the rank of brigadier general by brevet
L. Scott Rice (1980), major general, U.S. Air Force; commander of Massachusetts Air National Guard
Thomas R. Sargent III, vice admiral, U.S. Coast Guard; Vice Commandant 1970–1974
Walter L. Sharp, General, U.S. Army; Commander of United Nations Command, Commander of ROK-US Combined Forces Command and Commander of U.S. Forces Korea (2008–2011); former Director of the Joint Staff (2005–2008)
Franklin Guest Smith, Union Army veteran who attained the rank of brigadier general
Blake Wayne Van Leer, (1953), Commander and Captain in the U.S. Navy. Lead SeaBee program and lead the nuclear research and power unit at McMurdo Station during Operation Deep Freeze.
Peter D. Vroom (1862), Inspector General of the U.S. Army 
Arthur E. Williams, lieutenant general, U.S. Army Corps of Engineers; Chief of Engineers in 1992
Ronald J. Zlatoper (1963), Chief of Naval Personnel; Battle Group Commander in Desert Storm and Desert Shield; former Military Assistant to the Secretary of Defense; trustee

Politics and public service
J. Frank Aldrich (1877), U.S. Representative from Illinois
Truman H. Aldrich (1869), U.S. Representative from Alabama (1896–1897)
Myles Brand (1964), president of the National Collegiate Athletic Association
William Beidelman, Union Army Second Lieutenant, Second Mayor of Easton, Pennsylvania
George R. Dennis, United States Senator from Maryland
Francis Collier Draper (1854), Toronto lawyer, Toronto Police Chief
Thomas Farrell (1912), Deputy Commanding General of the Manhattan Project
Nariman Farvardin (1983), Provost of the University of Maryland
Lincoln D. Faurer (1964), director of the National Security Agency and chief, Central Security Service, 1981–1985
Richard Franchot, U.S. Representative from New York (1861–1863)
Arthur J. Gajarsa (1962), Judge of the United States Court of Appeals for the Federal Circuit, trustee
Naeem Gheriany, Minister of Higher Education and Scientific Research, Libya
Thomas J. Haas (1983), current president of Grand Valley State University
John Hammond, US Representative from New York, iron manufacturer
Walter F. Lineberger, U.S. State Representative of California, 1917–1921
Richard Linn (1965), Judge of the United States Court of Appeals for the Federal Circuit
George Low, manager of NASA's Apollo 11 project; President of RPI (1976–1984); namesake of RPI's Low Center for Industrial Innovation
 Hani Al-Mulki (MA, PhD), former Prime Minister of Jordan
John Olver (1958), Massachusetts State Representative (D) since 1991
Ely S. Parker, Civil War statesman, author of Appomattox Courthouse agreement
Clarkson Nott Potter (1843), U.S. Representative from New York, surveyor, lawyer, and president of the American Bar Association
Mark Shepard (1994), Vermont State Senator
Clement Hall Sinnickson, U.S. State Representative from New Jersey, 1875–1879
Peter G. Ten Eyck, New York State Representative
Tony Tether (1964), director of DARPA, 2001–2009
W. Aubrey Thomas, U.S. State Representative from Ohio, 1900–1911
De Volson Wood (1857), first president of  the American Society for Engineering Education

Science and technology
David Adler (1956), physicist
Don L. Anderson (1955), geophysicist
James Curtis Booth (1832), chemist
James Cantor (1988), neuroscientist, sex researcher
Ronald Collé (1972), nuclear physicist at NIST
George Hammell Cook (1839), state geologist of New Jersey
Edgar Cortright (1949), former NASA official
Ebenezer Emmons (1826), geologist, author of Natural History of New York (1848) and American Geology
Asa Fitch (1827), entomologist
Alan Fowler (1951), physicist, NAS member
David Ferrucci (1994), computer scientist, developed IBM Watson AI Jeopardy player 
Claire M. Fraser (1977), President and Director of The Institute for Genomic Research
Jeffrey M. Friedman, discovered leptin, a key hormone in the area of human obesity
Ivar Giaever (1964), shared the 1973 Nobel Prize in Physics for discoveries on tunneling phenomena in semiconductors; Institute Professor of Science
Morton Gurtin (1955), mathematical physicist
James Hall (1832), geologist and paleontologist
Jon Hall (1977), Executive Director of Linux International
Peter E. Hart, group senior vice president of the Ricoh company; artificial intelligence innovator
Edward C. Harwood, economist
Hermann A. Haus (1951), optical communications researcher, pioneer of quantum optics
Eben Norton Horsford (1838), "father of food science" and author, discovered baking powder
Douglass Houghton (1829), Michigan's first state geologist; namesake of a Michigan city, county, and lake
Robert Kennicutt (1973), astronomer
Nimai Mukhopadhyay, physics
Richard Klein (1966), astronomer
David Korn (1965), computer programmer who created the Korn Shell 
Richard Mastracchio (1987), NASA astronaut, flew on STS-106 Atlantis, 2000
Mark T. Maybury, Chief Scientist of U.S. Air Force
Pat Munday (1981), environmentalist
Heidi Jo Newberg (1987), professor of astrophysics at RPI
James "Kibo" Parry, satirist, Usenet personality, and typeface designer
Henry Augustus Rowland (1870), first president of the American Physical Society; Johns Hopkins University's first physics professor
Mark Russinovich, Windows software engineer
Peter Schwartz, futurist and writer
Robert C. Seacord, computer security specialist and author
Kip Siegel (1948), physicist, professor of physics at the University of Michigan
Andrew Sears, computer science professor at UMBC
Marlan Scully, physicist known for work in quantum optics
George Soper (1895), managing director of the American Society for the Control of Cancer, later the American Cancer Society
Chauncey Starr (1935), pioneer in nuclear energy
John L. Swigert Jr. (1965), astronaut, member of Apollo 13; recipient of 1970 Presidential Medal of Freedom; elected to U.S. House of Representatives for Colorado, 1982
Dennis Tito (1964), millionaire and the first space tourist to pay for his own ticket
Michael Tuomey (1835), state geologist of South Carolina and Alabama
Chris Welty (1995), computer scientist
Gregory R. Wiseman, NASA astronaut
Chris Wysopal, also known as Weld Pond (1987), member of the hacker think tank L0pht Heavy Industries, founder of Veracode

Sports
John Carter (1986), NHL forward 1986–1993
Kevin Constantine (1980), NHL head coach of the San Jose Sharks 1993–1995, the Pittsburgh Penguins 1997–2000, and the New Jersey Devils 2001–2002; recipient of USA Hockey's Distinguished Achievement Award
Erin Crocker (2003), NASCAR driver
Don Cutts (1974), NHL and International Hockey League (1945–2001) goaltender 1974–1984
Oren Eizenman (born 1985), Israeli-Canadian ice hockey player
Andrew Franks (2015), NFL placekicker for the Miami Dolphins since 2015.
Tim Friday (1985), NHL defenseman for the Detroit Red Wings 1985–1986
Ken Hammond (1985), NHL defenseman 1985–1993
Michael E. Herman (1962), President of the Kansas City Royals of Major League Baseball 1992–2000
Joé Juneau (1991), NHL forward 1991–2004, selected to the 1993 NHL All-Rookie Team, top scorer at the 1992 Winter Olympics while playing for the Canadian Olympic hockey team
Jason Kasdorf (2016), NHL goalie for the Buffalo Sabres since 2016.
Neil Little (1994), NHL scout for the Philadelphia Flyers organization; Goaltending Coach for the Philadelphia Phantoms of the American Hockey League 2007–2008; AHL goaltender 1994–2005; won the '97–98 and '04-05 Calder Cup with the Philadelphia Phantoms; inducted into the Philadelphia Phantoms Hall of Fame in 2006
Andrew Lord (2008), professional ice hockey player
Mike McPhee (1982), NHL forward 1983–1994; won the '85–86 Stanley Cup with the Montreal Canadiens; played in the 1989 NHL All Star Game
Matt Murley (2002), NHL forward 2003–2008
Kraig Nienhuis (1985), NHL forward 1985–1988
Adam Oates (1985), co-head coach of the New Jersey Devils 2014–2015; Head Coach of the Washington Capitals 2012–2014; Assistant Coach for the Tampa Bay Lightning 2009–2010 and the New Jersey Devils 2010–2012; NHL forward 1985–2004; played in the 1991–1994 and 1997 NHL All Star Games; inducted into the NHL Hockey Hall of Fame as a player in 2012
Matt Patricia (1996), Senior football advisor New England Patriots
Brian Pothier (2000), NHL defenseman 2000–2010
Daren Puppa (1985), NHL goaltender 1985–2000, played in the 1990 NHL All Star Game
Brad Tapper (2000), head coach of the Adirondack Thunder of the ECHL; NHL forward for the Atlanta Thrashers 2000–2003
Graeme Townshend (1989), head coach of the Jamaican Men's National Ice Hockey Team; Player Development Coordinator for the San Jose Sharks 2004–2008, NHL forward 1990–1994

Faculty

Past
Sharon Anderson-Gold : Science and Technology Studies
George C. Baldwin (1967–1977) : Nuclear Engineering
Bimal Kumar Bose (1971–1976) : Electrical Engineering
George Hammell Cook (1842–1846) : senior professor, Geology
Amos Eaton (1824–1842) : first professor, Geology
Michael James Gaffey (1984–2001) : Planetary Science
Sorab K. Ghandhi (1963–1992): Electronic Materials, Microelectronics
Benjamin Franklin Greene (1846–1859) : third senior professor and first director of RPI
James Hall (1833–1850) : Geology and Chemistry
Granville Hicks (1929–1935) : English
Matthew A. Hunter : Metallurgy, first to isolate titanium metal
Annette Kolodny : English
Matthew Koss (1990–2000) : Physics
Edith Hirsch Luchins : Mathematics
James D. Meindl (1986–1993) : Microelectronics
Vincent Meunier (2010-2022) : Physics
Henry Bradford Nason : Chemistry
E. Bruce Nauman (1981–2009) : Chemical Engineering
Gina O'Connor (1988–2018) : Business
Pauline Oliveros : Music
Robert Resnick (1956–1993): Physics
George Rickey : Architecture
Neil Rolnick : Music, founder of iEAR
Henry Augustus Rowland (1870?–1876) : Physics
Lee Segel (1960–1973) : Mathematics
Stephen Van Rensselaer : founder of the institute
Robert H. Wentorf, Jr. : Chemical Engineering

Current
Robert A. Baron : Psychology
Laura K. Boyer : Science and Technology Studies
Selmer Bringsjord : Artificial Intelligence, Logic
Linnda R. Caporael : Science and Technology Studies
Jonathan Dordick : Biochemical Engineering
Evan Douglis: Architecture
Faye Duchin : Economics
Anna Dyson : Architecture 
Ron Eglash : Science and Technology Studies
Peter Fox : Earth and Environmental Science, Computer Science, Cognitive Science
Ivar Giaever : Physics Professor Emeritus
Wayne D. Gray : Cognitive Science
James Hendler : Computer Science
Nikhil Koratkar : Nanotechnology
Robert J. Linhardt : Bioengineering
Deborah McGuinness : Computer Science
Don Millard : Electrical Engineering, Electronic Media
David Musser : Computer Science
Leik Myrabo : Spacecraft Propulsion
Satish Nambisan : Management
Heidi Jo Newberg : Astrophysics
Sal Restivo : Science and Technology Studies
David Rosowsky : Civil Engineering
Michael Shur : Semiconductor Electronics
Ron Sun : Cognitive Science
Boleslaw Szymanski : Computer Science
Jeff Trinkle : Computer Science
William A. Wallace : Decision Sciences and Engineering Systems
Langdon Winner : Science and Technology Studies
Houman Younessi : Systems Engineering (Hartford)
George Xu : Mechanical, Aerospace and Nuclear
Xi-Cheng Zhang : Physics and Terahertz Technology

References

Rensselaer Polytechnic Institute People
Rensselaer Polytechnic Institute